The 1999 Sultan Azlan Shah Cup was the ninth edition of field hockey tournament the Sultan Azlan Shah Cup held in Kuala Lumpur, Malaysia. Pakistan won their maiden title defeating South Korea 3-1 in the final after having finished runner-ups in four out of their last eight appearances. Sohail Abbas was the competition's top scorer with 12 goals.

Participating nations
Six countries participated in the year's tournament:

Results

Preliminary round 

Fixtures

Classification round

Fifth and sixth place

Third and fourth place

Final

Statistics

Final standings

Goalscorers 
There were 86 goals scored in 18 matches for an average of 4.78 goals per match

References

External links
Official website

1999 in field hockey
1999
1999 in Malaysian sport
1999 in Pakistani sport
1999 in Canadian sports
1999 in South Korean sport
1999 in New Zealand sport
1999 in German sport